The Southern Division, or Padmanabhapuram Division till 1921 and Trivandrum Division from 1921 to 1949, was one of the administrative subdivisions of the princely state of Travancore. It covered the five taluks of Agastiswaram, Eraniel, Kalkulam, Thovalay and Vilavancode and was administered by a civil servant of rank Diwan Peishkar equivalent to a District Collector in British India. The Southern division was predominantly Tamil-speaking in contrast to the other three divisions where Malayalam was spoken. In 1920, the neighbouring Trivandrum was also merged with the Southern division. In 1949, the princely state of Travancore was dissolved and the Southern Division was included in the Travancore-Cochin state of India.

In 1956, the Tamil-speaking taluks of Southern Division were transferred to the neighbouring Madras State as per the States Reorganisation Act of 1956 and forms the present-day Kanyakumari district of Tamil Nadu. The Malayalam-speaking taluks of the erstwhile Trivandrum division form the Thiruvananthapuram district of Kerala. The headquarters of the Southern Division were at Padmanabhapuram.

See also 
 Northern Division (Travancore)
 Quilon Division
 Trivandrum Division

References 

Divisions of Travancore